Marmayogi is a 1964 Indian Telugu-language swashbuckler film, produced by S. K. Habibulla and directed by B. A. Subba Rao. It stars N. T. Rama Rao, Krishna Kumari and Kanta Rao, with music composed by Ghantasala. The film is a remake of the 1951 Tamil film of the same name.

Plot 
Once upon a time in a kingdom, the King (Gummadi) is attracted towards a court dancer Chenchala (Leelavathi) and decides to marry her. The King's brother-in-law Purushotham (A. V. Subba Rao), Chief Commander, obstructs his way and the King ostracises him from the kingdom. After the marriage, Chenchala kills the King along with two princes by pushing him off a boat and usurps his powers. Chenchala appoints herself as the new Queen regnant, and the kingdom experiences a reign of terror. Years roll by, a sage called Marmayogi arrives at the kingdom with his son Bhaskar (Kanta Rao) and a girl Prabhavathi (Krishna Kumari), and joins the Queen as her adviser and Bhaskar is appointed Army Commander. At the same time, in the countryside, Prabhakar (N. T. Rama Rao) functions as a de facto leader of the people, helps them in various ways and fights the Queen's misrule. When he becomes a big threat to the Queen, she orders his capture and also sends Prabhavathias, a spy, to Prabhakar, but she falls in love with him.

Prabhakar gets periodic instructions from the Goddess on what needs to be done and he follows the same. The queen gets scared by a ghost which appears regularly and warns her of the impending punishment she deserves for her misdeeds. Meanwhile, Prabhavathi and Prabhakar's followers are captured by the army, Prabhakar rescues his people, captures the queen and brings her to his hideout. When the ghost appears there, she confesses her crime of killing the King. When she is about to be executed, Bhaskar's army enters and captures everyone. Bhaskar also finds out that the ghost is a father, and he has been giving information to Prabhakar secretly. Hence he also gets arrested for being a traitor. The Queen returns to her throne and orders the execution of the sage, Prabhakar, and others. When Prabhakar is about to be killed, the sage reveals the truth that he none other than the King and removes his disguise. He had escaped under the water using his yogic skills. Prabhakar and Bhaskar are his sons and Prabhavathi is the daughter of Purushotham. Shocked to see the dead King return, the Queen dies. Finally, the movie ends with the King declaring Prabhakar as the ruler of the kingdom.

Cast 
N. T. Rama Rao as Prabhakar
Krishna Kumari as Prabhavathi
Kanta Rao as Bhaskar
Gummadi as Maharaju / Marmayogi
Chadalavada as Bairagi
Balakrishna as Sannasi
A. V. Subba Rao as Purushotham
Leelavathi as Chenchala
Meena Kumari as Chakarakelli

Production 
N. T. Rama Rao signed Marmayogi as part of a five-film deal with Jupiter Pictures.

Soundtrack 

Music composed by Ghantasala.

References 

1960s Telugu-language films
Indian swashbuckler films
Telugu remakes of Tamil films